J71 may refer to:
 Allison J71, a turbojet engine
 LNER Class J71, a British steam locomotive class
 Triaugmented truncated dodecahedron